Fernando Román is the name of two footballers:

 Fernando Román (footballer, born 1993), Spanish centre-back
 Fernando Román (footballer, born 1998), Argentine left-back